Palliniakos Football Club is a Greek football club based in Pallini, East Attica, Greece.

History
"Palliniakos Sports Club" was founded in Pallini in April 1939 by Nikolaos Anastasiou and Marios Konstantinidis. Some of the players who made up the first team were: Sarantis Lizardos (goalkeeper), Antonios Papadimas, Georgios Rentoumis, Georgios Lekkas, Ioannis Elias Kontogiannis, Georgios Pittakis, Dimitrios Besilas, Konstantinos Geidonis, Nikolaos Anastasiou served as president of the association until 1958. From 1949 to 1958, he appointed Nikolaos Milosis, the later mayor of Pallini, as general manager and coach. After 1958, the president of the association was: Tselios Petros, Milisis Nikolaos, Kontogiannis Konstantinos, Malliaros Dimitrios, Anastasiou Leonardos, Mertyris Lazaros and Karabinis Konstantinos of Vasilios.

In 1953, the team won the Mediterranean Cup, a great event for the small village. Among others, the following players took part in this success: Vasilios Skouras, Anastasios Karabinis, Ioannis Baxevanis, Vasilios Rentoumis, Christos Levantis, Athanasios Chatzistamatiou. Since the mid-1960s, Palliniakos has officially joined the FCA Athens, officially competing in its championships. In 2000 he joined the newly formed FCA Eastern Attica and has been competing in its leagues ever since. In 2018, he won the championship and won the historic promotion to the Gamma Ethniki, prevailing solemnly in the fiesta of A.O. Koropi with 6-0. Debut match for the club in the championship of the Gamma Ethniki was an away match on 17 October 2018, against Ialyssos Rhodes where it was defeated 3-2.

Honours

Domestic

 East Attica FCA champion: 1
 2017–18

References

Football clubs in Attica
East Attica
Association football clubs established in 1939
1939 establishments in Greece
Gamma Ethniki clubs